Joao Gabriel Farinello Rosa (born 9 July 1989 in Sao Paulo, Brazil) is a Brazilian professional footballer who plays for Portuguesa Santista as a defender.

External links

Living people
1989 births
Brazilian footballers
Brazilian expatriate footballers
Expatriate footballers in Mexico
Brazilian expatriate sportspeople in Mexico
Expatriate footballers in Saudi Arabia
Brazilian expatriate sportspeople in Saudi Arabia
Association football defenders
Volta Redonda FC players
Rio Claro Futebol Clube players
Fortaleza Esporte Clube players
Atlético Monte Azul players
Clube Atlético Penapolense players
Rio Branco Esporte Clube players
Alebrijes de Oaxaca players
Esporte Clube São Bento players
Al Batin FC players
Tampico Madero F.C. footballers
Associação Portuguesa de Desportos players
Campeonato Brasileiro Série C players
Campeonato Brasileiro Série D players
Saudi Professional League players
Ascenso MX players
Footballers from São Paulo